Capivariano Futebol Clube, commonly referred to as Capivariano, is a Brazilian professional association football club based in Capivari, São Paulo. The team competes in the Campeonato Paulista Série A3, the third tier of the São Paulo state football league.

History
The club was founded on October 12, 1918. Capivariano won the Campeonato Paulista Série A3 in 1984 and the Campeonato Paulista Série A2 in 2014. The team's main rivals are Paulínia FC and Primavera EC.

Achievements
 Campeonato Paulista Série A2:
 Winner (1): 2014
 Campeonato Paulista Série A3:
 Winner (1): 1984
 Campeonato Paulista Segunda Divisão:
 Runner-up (2): 1994, 2011

Stadium
Capivariano Futebol Clube play their home games at Arena Capivari (old Estádio Municipal Carlos Colnaghi).

References

 
Association football clubs established in 1918
Football clubs in São Paulo (state)
1918 establishments in Brazil